The Walt Disney Company was founded in 1923 and since 1996 has acquired many properties to
increase its size in the media industry. The table shows the most substantial and important acquisitions that Disney has made over the years.

Acquisitions

Former acquisitions

See also
 Acquisition of 21st Century Fox by Disney

References

 
Disney